Norsk Film was a Norwegian film production company established in 1932 and disestablished in 2001. It was located in Bærum, with studio facilities at Jar. The company was the leading film producer in Norway by number of films, with a total of about 150 cinema productions at the time of its disestablishment, or about 25% of all Norwegian films.

References

Film production companies of Norway
2001 disestablishments in Norway
Mass media companies established in 1932
Companies based in Bærum
Mass media companies disestablished in 2001
Norwegian companies established in 1932